Martin Sherwood (10 January 1942 – 10 May 2011) was a British science fiction author, organic chemist and an editor of Chemistry & Industry.

Science fiction 

His novels were Survival (New English Library, 1975) and Maxwell's Demon (Ultramarine, 1976, ; New English Library, 1976).

Chemistry 

Sherwood had a Ph.D. in organic chemistry and was editor of industry journal Chemistry & Industry from 1976.

References 

 Authors: Sherwood, Martin (John Clute, The Encyclopedia Of Science Fiction, 3rd ed., 2012)

British science fiction writers
1942 births
2011 deaths
20th-century British novelists